Partovi az Quran (lit. a shining ray from the Quran) is an exegesis on the Quran written by Mahmoud Taleghani in six volumes. It was written while he was imprisoned by the Shah.

Exegetical approach
One of the features of this commentary is lexicographical analysis and pondering on Quranic literature. The author also makes moderate use of theological methods. He advises the reader not to limit his understanding of Quran by making any pre-assumptions, either scientific or philosophical. Taleghani also emphasizes relying on hadith for understanding Mutashabihat (uncertainties).

References

Shia tafsir